Let's Make a Dream (French: Faisons un rêve...) is a 1936 French romantic comedy film directed by Sacha Guitry and starring Guitry, Raimu and Jacqueline Delubac. It is an adaptation of the 1916 play of the same title by Guitry.

The film's sets were designed by the art director Robert Gys. It was shot at the Epinay Studios on the outskirts of Paris, and distributed by the French subsidiary of Tobis Film.

Cast 
 Sacha Guitry as L'amant
 Raimu as Le mari
 Jacqueline Delubac as La femme
 Arletty as Une invitée (prologue)
 Louis Baron fils as Un invité (prologue)
 Pierre Bertin as Un invité (prologue)
 Victor Boucher as Un invité (prologue)
 Jean Coquelin as Un invité (prologue)
 Claude Dauphin as Un invité (prologue)
 Rosine Deréan as Une invitée (prologue)
 Yvette Guilbert as Une invitée (prologue)
 André Lefaur as Un invité (prologue)
 Marcel Lévesque a Un invité (prologue)
 Marguerite Moreno as Une invitée (prologue)
 Gabriel Signoret as Un invité (prologue)
 Michel Simon as Un invité (prologue)
 Andrée Guize as Une servante
 Robert Seller as Un maître d'hôtel
 Louis Kerly as Le valet de chambre

References

Bibliography 
 Dayna Oscherwitz & MaryEllen Higgins. The A to Z of French Cinema. Scarecrow Press, 2009.

External links 
 

1936 romantic comedy films
1936 films
Films directed by Sacha Guitry
Films shot at Epinay Studios
French films based on plays
French romantic comedy films
1930s French-language films
Tobis Film films
1930s French films